is a Japanese paint and paint products manufacturing company. It is the fourth largest paint manufacturer globally based on revenue in 2020.

History
The company, founded in 1881 by Jujiro Motegi under the name Komyosha (Yamato Jujiro Shoten). In 1898 the company was incorporated and renamed Nippon Paint Manufacturing, while in 1927 the company's name changed to Nippon Paint.

In 1954, Nippon Paint established a 50/50 joint venture with Bee Chemical. In 2006, it became a wholly owned subsidiary of Nippon Paint.

In October 2014 Nippon Paint was reorganized into a holding company and the company adopted its current name.

In August 2020, the Singaporean paints and coatings manufacturer Wuthelam Group raised its stake in Nippon Paint from 39% to 58.7% in exchange for its stake in the joint venture in Singapore.

Nippon Paint (Singapore)
In 1955, Goh Cheng Liang set up his first paint shop in Singapore and became the main local distributor of Nippon Paint. In 1962 the company set up a joint venture with Goh Cheng Liang, with a 60-40 holding, the Nipsea Management Group. In 1965, Nippon Paint set up its first paint manufacturing plant in Singapore.

In November 2014, with the exception of Nippon Paint Indonesia, the NIPSEA Group officially became a subsidiary of Nippon Paint Holdings.

Nippon Paint (India) 
Nippon Paint is a Japan-based company that has been in India for over a decade now. They have also been one of the sponsors of Chennai Super Kings and Royal Challengers Bangalore in Indian Premier League.

Nippon Paint (United States) 
In 2016 Nippon Paint entered into a merger agreement with Dunn-Edwards Corporation, one of the United States’ largest
independent manufacturers of architectural, industrial and high performance paints. Terms of the deal
were not disclosed but the transaction was finalized in early March 2017 after which Dunn-Edwards will become a
wholly owned subsidiary of Nippon Paint (USA) Inc. Dunn-Edwards is based in California and has more
than 130 company-owned stores and over 80 authorized dealers mainly in the southwest United States.

Presence
The company and its subsidiaries have a presence in Japan, Singapore, Malaysia, South Korea, China, Indonesia, Philippines, Thailand, Vietnam, India, Sri Lanka, Pakistan, United Kingdom, Germany, Greece, Norway, Netherlands, Lithuania, Poland, Russia, Slovenia, Spain, Bulgaria, Estonia, Italy, United States, Brazil, Australia, the United Arab Emirates, Bangladesh and Turkey.

References

External links
  

Chemical companies of Japan
Chemical companies established in 1881
Companies listed on the Tokyo Stock Exchange
Japanese brands
Japanese companies established in 1881
Manufacturing companies based in Osaka
Multinational companies headquartered in Japan
Paint manufacturers
1940s initial public offerings